No Face No Case is a collaborative studio album by 2 Chainz and T.R.U. (The Real University, which comprises Sleepy Rose, Worl, Skooly and Hott LockedN). It was released on February 7, 2020 via Atlantic Records. Production was handled by several record producers, including Cubeatz, Hitmaka, June the Genius and Tay Keith. It features guest appearances from Bear1boss, NLE Choppa, NoCap, Quando Rondo and Quavo. The album debuted at number 182 on the Billboard 200 in the United States.

Track listing

Charts

References

2020 albums
2 Chainz albums
Atlantic Records albums
Collaborative albums
Albums produced by Cubeatz
Albums produced by Tay Keith
Albums produced by Beat Butcha